Region IV (Spanish: Región IV. Cuautitlán Izcalli) is an intrastate region within the State of Mexico. It lies to the north of Mexico City, in the Valley of Mexico, bordering the state of Hidalgo. The whole region is one of the ten in the state which form part of the Metropolitan Area of the Valley of Mexico, although Villa del Carbón is not included in the definition of the metropolitan area.

The region comprises five municipalities, Coyotepec, Cuautitlán Izcalli, Huehuetoca, Tepotzotlán, and Villa del Carbón.

References

Regions of the State of Mexico